Abdul Nasir (born 25 December 1998) is a Pakistani cricketer. He made his Twenty20 debut on 20 February 2020, for Quetta Gladiators in the 2020 Pakistan Super League.

References

External links
 

1998 births
Living people
Pakistani cricketers
Quetta Gladiators cricketers
Cricketers from Quetta